HD 182475 is a Delta Scuti variable star in the equatorial constellation of Aquila.

References

External links
 HD 182475
 HR 7366
 Image HD 182475

Aquila (constellation)
182475
Delta Scuti variables
Aquilae, V1691
A-type main-sequence stars
7366
095453
Durchmusterung objects